The DeSoto Diplomat is an automobile produced by DeSoto from 1946 to 1962 for sale in export markets other than the United States and Canada. 

The export DeSoto based on the Plymouth was first introduced in 1937 and was built in Detroit. Chrysler Corporation of Canada, which before 1947 enjoyed "Imperial Preference" (reduced tariff barriers in British empire markets) and did not start building export DeSotos until late in the 1939 model year.

In 1946, the export DeSoto became the DeSoto Diplomat. They were either exported or assembled locally (from CKD kits) in Europe, South Africa, South America, Hawaii, New Zealand, and Australia. In 1955, Chrysler of Canada did not export any cars and all 1955 Diplomats came from Detroit. In the late 1950s, some European taxicab drivers preferred to have a Perkins P4C diesel engine in the Diplomat; these diesel engines were installed on a Belgian assembly line.

From 1938 to 1956, the export DeSoto used Plymouth bodies with a grille that looked similar to the regular DeSoto but fit the Plymouth grille opening. From 1957 to 1959, the DeSoto Diplomat used the DeSoto Firesweep front clip with Plymouth body.

The 1960 and 1961 DeSoto Diplomats were based on the full-size Dodge Dart. Although 1960 was the last year for DeSoto in Canada and 1961 for the United States and export markets, Chrysler South Africa built a number of 1962 DeSoto Diplomats based on the Dodge Dart 440 sedan. After 1962, the Diplomat name was retired and the Dodge Dart was marketed under its own name in South Africa.

16 years after DeSoto ended production, Chrysler would revive the Diplomat name for an M-body Dodge.

Australian production
Chrysler Australia introduced a locally produced SP24 series DeSoto Diplomat, based on the 1953 US Plymouth P24 in 1953. This was followed by the SP25 series Diplomat which was based on the 1954 US Plymouth P25 Cambridge/Cranbrook, and was built from 1954 to 1957. The Diplomat was available in "Custom", "Regent" and "Plaza" trim. An Australian developed Coupe Utility version of the Sedan was introduced in 1956. The Diplomat models were an alternative to the Plymouth Savoy and Plymouth Belvedere or the Dodge Kingsway which, aside from differences in grilles and badging, were essentially the same vehicle. All used the same basic body and all models combined managed to take only 5% of the Australian market in 1955. The Diplomat was replaced by the Australian-built Chrysler Royal, which was derived from the Australian-built P25 Plymouth and was built from 1957 to 1963.

References

Cars of Canada
DeSoto vehicles
Cars introduced in 1946
1950s cars
1960s cars